A diazaquinone is a chemical compound that has an heterocyclic aromatic core including two consecutive doubly-bonded nitrogen atoms , with the two  carbon units adjacent to the nitrogens replaced by carbonyl (ketone) groups . These carbon and nitrogen atoms then comprise a diacyl diimide unit, .

Two canonical examples are 3,6-pyridazinedione (a quinone of pyridine), emerald-green; and 1,4-phthalazinedione (a quinone of phthalazine) a green crystalline solid (both soluble in acetone and stable at -77 °C).

The name was proposed by Thomas J. Kealy in 1962.

References

Nitrogen compounds